The 1869 Hereford by-election was fought on 30 March 1869.  The by-election was fought due to the Void election of both  the incumbent MPs of the Liberal Party George Clive  and  John Wyllie.  It was won by the Liberal candidates Edward Clive  and  Chandos Wren-Hoskyns.

References

Politics of Hereford
1869 elections in the United Kingdom
1869 in England
By-elections to the Parliament of the United Kingdom in Herefordshire constituencies
19th century in Herefordshire
March 1869 events